Joseph Nathaniel Kendall (October 2, 1909 – November 25, 1965) was an American football player.  Nicknamed "Tarzan" for his athletic prowess, Kendall dominated black college football in the 1930s while leading Kentucky State to a black college football national championship in 1934.  He led the Thorobreds to an Orange Blossom Classic victory over Florida A&M in 1935 en route to a 29–7–3 overall record during his playing years. Kendall was a three-time First Team All-America selection from 1934 to 1936 by the Pittsburgh Courier.  Following his player career, he served as a coach, teacher, and school principal. As a result of his significant contributions as a recreational director in Owensboro, Kentucky, a park was named in his honor. Kendall was inducted into the Kentucky State Athletics Hall of Fame in 1975.  He was elected to the College Football Hall of Fame in 2007 and he is the first inductee from Kentucky State.

References

External links
 
 

1909 births
1965 deaths
Kentucky State Thorobreds football players
College Football Hall of Fame inductees
Sportspeople from Owensboro, Kentucky
Players of American football from Kentucky
African-American players of American football
20th-century African-American sportspeople